Zainapora is a sub district in the Shopian district of Jammu and Kashmir, India. It is one of three sub districts of Shopian district. The sub district headquarter is located in Zainapora town. Zainapora is located  towards north-east of district Anantnag.

Education
 Jawahar Navodaya Vidyalaya Shopian (JNV Aglar)
 Government Higher Secondary School Zainapora 
 Government Degree College Zainapora 
 NIPS Zainapora
 Government High School Aglar
 Al Fallah English Medium School Aglar
 Allama Iqbal Memorial Institute Zainapora
 Government Middle School Safanagri

References

Shopian district